Fergie Olver is a Canadian former game show host and sportscaster. He is best known for co-hosting the 1980s children's game show Just Like Mom with his wife Catherine Swing, and his work as a broadcaster and dugout reporter for the Toronto Blue Jays. Olver's daughter, Carrie Olver, is known for her work on shopping channels and The Weather Network.

Career 

Olver began his sports career as an outfielder in the minor leagues, then with Saskatoon/Medicine Hat in the semi-pro Western Baseball League. He began his broadcasting career in the Moose Jaw/Regina area. In 1969, he moved to CFCF-TV in Montreal and then to CFTO-TV in Toronto. He spent the remainder of his broadcasting career with the Blue Jays (1981–1996), covering games on CTV, TSN, and BBS. In 2004, he was nominated for the Ford C. Frick Award.

He appeared in the 1971 film Face-Off as a member of the press.

References

External links
 

Year of birth missing (living people)
Living people
Canadian game show hosts
Canadian television sportscasters
Major League Baseball broadcasters
People from Moose Jaw
Toronto Blue Jays announcers